Military Merit Order may refer to:

 Military Merit Order (Bavaria)
 Military Merit Order (Württemberg)

See also
 Military Merit Cross (disambiguation)
 Military Merit Medal (disambiguation)
 Order of Military Merit (disambiguation)

Military awards and decorations